Hapoel Galil Elyon, also known as Hapoel Nofar Energy Galil Elion for sponsorship reasons, is an Israeli basketball club. The team competes in the Israeli Basketball Premier League, the top tier of Israeli basketball, and internationally in the Balkan League. The team represents the northern region of the country – the Upper Galilee, and the Golan Heights.

In June 2008, the club rights in the Israeli Basketball Premier League transferred to Hapoel Gilboa (which had previously been merged with Hapoel Afula, which regained their independence) to form a new club, Hapoel Gilboa Galil, which represents the Gilboa and Lower Galilee regions. The team was re-established in 2009.

History

American-Israeli Brad Leaf played for 12 years for Hapoel Galil Elyon. He won the Israeli Basketball Premier League MVP award in 1989–90. In both 1989-90 and 1991-92 he was voted a member of the Israeli Basketball Premier League Quintet, an award given to the five best players of each season of the Israeli Basketball Premier League.

In 1992–93 the club, then coached by Pini Gershon, became the first club based outside Tel Aviv to win the Israeli Championship, ending Maccabi Tel Aviv's 23-year winning streak. They also won the State Cup twice, in 1988 and 1992.

Between 1990 and 2008, several of the Israel's most successful basketball players came through the club, including Nadav Henefeld, Oded Kattash, Doron Sheffer, Gur Shelef, Lior Eliyahu, and Sharon Sasson, earning the team the nickname "the Israeli basketball college".

In 2021, the club was promoted from the Israeli National League to the Israeli Basketball Premier League for the first time since the merger.

Honors
Total titles: 4

Domestic competitions
Israeli Championship
Winners: 1993
Runners-up: 1990, 1995
State Cup
Winners: 1988, 1992
Runners-up: 1987, 1990, 1998

Lower division competitions
Liga Artzit / Israeli National League 
Winners: 1979 , 2021

European competitions
 FIBA Saporta Cup 
 Semifinalist (1): 1992–93

Regional competitions
Balkan League
Winners: 2022

Players

Current roster

Season by season

Notable players

 Shamuel Nachmias

Notable coaches

 
 David Blatt
 Pini Gershon
 Oded Kattash
 Erez Edelstein
 Muli Katzurin

References

External links
Team website hebrew

 
Basketball teams established in 1978
Basketball teams in Israel
Former Israeli Basketball Premier League teams